Dance in the Midnight is a posthumous album credited to Marc Bolan of T. Rex. It was released in 1983 by record label Marc on Wax and was the third LP to be released after his death in 1977.

Content 

The album consists of unreleased studio outtakes and demos recorded by the band in the early to mid-1970s. The album contains overdubs recorded in the 1980s by session musicians at the request of the record's producers, John and Shan Bramley.

The majority of tracks have subsequently been released in their untouched format on the Unchained series.

Release 

Dance in the Midnight was released in 1983 by record label Marc on Wax. It reached number 83 in the UK Albums Chart.

Track listing 
All tracks composed by Marc Bolan; except where indicated

References 

T. Rex (band) albums
1983 albums
Albums published posthumously